The Ukrainian Catholic Apostolic Exarchate of Volhynia, Polesia and Pidliashia was a short-lived (1931–44) pre-diocesan Eastern Catholic (notably Byzantine Rite, Ukrainian language) jurisdiction in three parts of present Ukraine.

History 
 Established in 1931 as Apostolic Exarchate of Volhynia, Polesia and Pidliashia / Wolhynien, Polissia und Pidliashia (in German)
 Suppressed in 1944 after Stalin's Red Army reconquered the area.

Its only incumbent was:
 Blessed Bishop Mykola Czarneckyj, Redemptorists (C.SS.R.) (born Ukraine), Apostolic Exarch of Volhynia, Polesia and Pidliashia of the Ukrainians (Ukraine) (1939–1944), Titular Bishop of Lebedus (1931.01.16 – death 1959.04.02).

See also 
 List of Catholic dioceses in Ukraine

Sources and external links 
 GCatholic - data for all sections

Former Eastern Catholic dioceses
Apostolic exarchates
History of the Ukrainian Greek Catholic Church